Sha Tsui New Village is a village in Sai Kung District, Hong Kong.

See also
 Man Yee Wan New Village

External links
 Delineation of area of existing village Sha Tsui New Village (Sai Kung) for election of resident representative (2019 to 2022)

Villages in Sai Kung District, Hong Kong